Prorella discoidalis is a moth in the family Geometridae first described by John Arthur Grossbeck in 1908. It is found in the US states of Arizona, New Mexico and Utah.

The wingspan is about 17 mm. The forewings are gray, with a very large black discal spot. The crosslines are faint and are indicated by short streaks on the veins. There seem to be two generations per year with adults on wing in June and again in August.

References

Moths described in 1908
Eupitheciini